The Peter I Monument, also known as the Peter the Great Monument (Памятник Петру Великому), is a monument to Peter I of Russia located in Taganrog, Russia. It is a bronze statue created by the sculptor Mark Antokolsky and first installed in 1903.

History of the monument
The idea to open a memorial to Peter I of Russia, who founded Taganrog in 1698, came to Achilles Alferaki, the mayor of Taganrog from 1880 to 1887. The Emperor Alexander III of Russia gave his permission for the memorial on June 5, 1893.

In 1897, Taganrog City Council issued a resolution to request the sculptor Mark Antokolsky to produce a memorial to Peter I. In April 1898, Anton Chekhov met with Antokolsky] in Paris to arrange the production of a bronze statue. The statue was moulded in the atelier of Thibaut Brothers in Paris. The pedestal for the monument was made in 1901 by the artist Eduards, owner of an atelier in Odessa. The monument was delivered from Marseilles to Taganrog on July 27, 1901 by the steamboat Despino. Petrovskaya Street near the central gates to the Municipal Park was selected as the site for the monument. The memorial to Peter I The Great was solemnly inaugurated on May 13, 1903 on Petrovskaya Street at the crossing with Campehnausen Street. The inscription on the pedestal reads: To the Emperor Peter I, Taganrog 1698-1898.

On January 25, 1924, the monument was dismantled by the Soviets and placed in the Chekhov Museum, which was at that time located at Chekhov Library. By 1933, the monument was enclosed into a wooden box in the court of Chekhov Museum. 

In 1940, the Rostov Oblast government decided to re-inaugurate the monument, though not at its historical location on Petrovskaya Street, but on Komsomolsky Boulevard near the Taganrog seaport. The preparations began, but the German invasion of the Soviet Union prevented these plans from realization. 

On July 18, 1943, during Occupation of Taganrog, it was re-inaugurated by Nazi Germany authorities in front of the central entrance to Gorky Park.

In September 1948, during the celebrations of the 250th anniversary of Taganrog's foundation, the monument was placed at its current located on Komsomolsky Boulevard.

Old and modern views of the Peter the Great Monument in Taganrog

External links and references
 Энциклопедия Таганрога. — Ростов-на-Дону: Ростиздат, 2003

Outdoor sculptures in Russia
1903 sculptures
Monuments and memorials in Taganrog
Cultural heritage monuments in Taganrog
Monuments and memorials to Peter the Great
Cultural heritage monuments of federal significance in Rostov Oblast